Thomas Hord Herndon (July 1, 1828 – March 28, 1883) was a U.S. Representative from Alabama who also served as an officer in the Confederate States Army during the American Civil War.

Biography
Born in Erie, Greene (now Hale) County, Alabama, the son of Thomas Hord Herndon, Sr., and Sarah Emma Toulmin Herndon.  His mother was the daughter of federal Judge Harry Toulmin. Herndon attended a private school, graduated from the University of Alabama at Tuscaloosa in 1847 and attended the law school of Harvard University in 1848. He was admitted to the bar of Alabama in 1849 and commenced practice in Eutaw, Alabama. He also was the editor of the Eutaw Democrat in 1850.

Herndon moved to Mobile, Alabama in 1853 and resumed the practice of law. In 1857 and 1858 he served as member of the State house of representatives and became a trustee of the University of Alabama in 1858. He returned to Greene County in 1859 and served as member of the State secession convention in 1861. During the Civil War he volunteered for the Confederate States Army and joined the 36th Regiment Alabama Infantry as a Major. He ended the war as the regiment's Colonel  and was wounded twice in battle.

After the war he moved to Mobile and once again resumed the practice of his profession. He was an unsuccessful Democratic candidate for Governor of Alabama in 1872, though he was elected as member of the State constitutional convention, which met September 6, 1875, and served as member of the State house of representatives in 1876 and 1877. Herndon was elected as a Democrat to the Forty-sixth, Forty-seventh, and Forty-eighth Congresses and served from March 4, 1879, until his death in Mobile, Alabama, March 28, 1883, before the convening of the Forty-eighth Congress.

He was interred in Magnolia Cemetery.

See also
List of United States Congress members who died in office (1790–1899)

References

External links
 

1828 births
1883 deaths
People from Hale County, Alabama
Alabama Secession Delegates of 1861
University of Alabama alumni
Harvard Law School alumni
Confederate States Army officers
Democratic Party members of the United States House of Representatives from Alabama
19th-century American politicians